Manmatha Leelai is a 1976 Indian Tamil-language romantic comedy film written and directed by K. Balachander. The film stars Kamal Haasan and Aalam. A number of actresses debuted on Tamil industry through this film, including Hema Chaudhary, Jaya Prada, Y. Vijaya among others. It was released on 27 February 1986. Though the film was criticised for its bold content when it released, it has received cult status with passing years and is considered a trendsetter.

Plot 

The film explores the life journey of a womaniser Madhu and his affairs with various women, including those who are married. The main conflict is between Madhu and his wife Rekha. Balachander's genius lies in objectifying married women of the city whilst creating a loving wife who's torn between accepting her husband and living a separated life after having discovered the travails of her own father. This movie has an very interesting character called Iyer, who works as a subordinate to Madhu. Madhu confesses all his affairs and happenings to Mr. Iyer. Madhu gets relieved after confessing, on the other side Mr. Iyer starts losing his peaceful life and starts calling out names of women in Madhu's affairs. Mr. Iyer quits his job and ends up preaching on how a married life should be.

Cast 
 Kamal Haasan as Madhu
 Halam as Rekha
 Hema Chaudhary as Madhavi
 Jaya Prada as Kannagi
 Y. Vijaya as Bhargavi (Ms. Wrong Number)
 Reena as Anju
 Y. G. Mahendran as Petition Kodhandam
 Y. G. Parthasarathy as Rekha's father
 Radha Ravi (credited as M. R. R. Ravi)
 T. D. Kusalakumari as Rekha's mother
 Praveena Bhagyaraj (uncredited role)

Production 
M. R. Radha's son Radha Ravi made his acting debut with the film. The coat that Kamal Haasan wears prominently in the film was actually his brother Charuhasan's.

Soundtrack 
The soundtrack was composed by M. S. Viswanathan, with lyrics by Kannadasan. The song "Naadham Ennum" is set in Shree ranjani raga, while "Hello My Dear" is set in Dharmavati.

Reception 
The film struggled to get a censor certificate. Even though it stirred up controversies when it was released, it later became a cult classic, and is considered a trendsetter. Kamal Haasan said, "it was an interesting subject. For that period it was unusual, a breaking down of the fidelity stereotypes". Though Balachander was disappointed with the dubbed version, titled Manmadha Leela, it fared better than the Tamil original. This was the first of many dubbed Telugu films where Haasan's voice was dubbed by S. P. Balasubrahmanyam. The film was dubbed in Hindi as Meethi Meethi Baatein (1977), which fared reasonably well. Kanthan of Kalki called it a problematic story but gets specialised by skill in creating characters and added there is nothing special about it as a screenplay but Balachander has added innovation to the film by sticking the scenes quickly.

References

External links 
 

1970s Tamil-language films
1976 films
Films about adultery in India
Films directed by K. Balachander
Films scored by M. S. Viswanathan
Films with screenplays by K. Balachander
Indian romantic comedy films
Indian sex comedy films